Coleophora albella is a moth of the family Coleophoridae. It is found in most of Europe.

Adults are on wing from May to June.

The larvae feed on Silene nutans and Silene vulgaris. They feed within the seed capsules of their host plant, living within a movable case constructed from an empty seed case, which is then attached to successive pods, while the larva feeds on the seeds.

Status
The species is considered to be endangered in Great Britain, and can be found only in one location in Avon.

References

External links
 Coleophora albella

albella
Moths described in 1788
Moths of Europe
Taxa named by Carl Peter Thunberg